Luka is a 1992 Croatian film directed by Tomislav Radić, starring Ivo Gregurević, Mirta Zečević, Zlatko Crnković and Damir Lončar.

The script was based on the 1976 novel of the same name by Antun Šoljan.

External links
 

1992 films
Croatian drama films
1990s Croatian-language films
Films based on Croatian novels